A Waxed jacket is a type of hip-length jacket made from waxed cotton cloth, iconic of British and Irish country life. Today it is commonly worn for outdoor rural pursuits such as hunting, shooting and fishing. It is a cotton jacket made water-resistant by a paraffin-based waxing, typically with a tartan lining and a corduroy or leather collar. The main drawback of a waxed fabric is its lack of breathability.

The origin of the waxed jacket is in the coated garments also known as oilskin.

See also
 British country clothing

References

Jackets

it:Impermeabile (abbigliamento)#Cerata